is a railway station in the city of  Shinshiro, Aichi Prefecture, Japan, operated by Central Japan Railway Company (JR Tōkai).

Lines
Mikawa-Kawai Station is served by the Iida Line, and is located 45.2 kilometers from the starting point of the line at Toyohashi Station.

Station layout
The station has one island platform connected to the station building by a level crossing. The station is unattended.

Platforms

Adjacent stations

|-
!colspan=5|Central Japan Railway Company

Station history
Mikawa-Kawai Station was established on February 1, 1923, as a station on the now-defunct . The Sanshin Railway began operations to this station from December 21, 1933. On August 1, 1943, both lines were nationalized along with some other local lines to form the Japanese Government Railways (JGR) Iida Line. All freight operations were discontinued by 1966. The station has been unattended since November 1, 1986.  Along with its division and privatization of JNR on April 1, 1987, the station came under the control and operation of the Central Japan Railway Company.

Surrounding area
Toyokawa River
Ure Dam

See also
 List of Railway Stations in Japan

References

External links

Railway stations in Japan opened in 1923
Railway stations in Aichi Prefecture
Iida Line
Stations of Central Japan Railway Company
Shinshiro, Aichi